The 2020 Thailand Open (also known as the GSB Thailand Open presented by E@ for sponsorship reasons) was a Women's Tennis Association (WTA) tournament played on outdoor hard courts. It was the 2nd edition of the Hua Hin Championships as part of the WTA International tournaments of the 2020 WTA Tour. It took place at the True Arena Hua Hin in Hua Hin, Thailand, from 10 February to 16 February 2020.

Points and prize money

Point distribution

Prize money

Singles main draw entrants

Seeds

1 Rankings as of February 3, 2020.

Other entrants
The following players received wildcards into the singles main draw:
  Eugenie Bouchard
  Patcharin Cheapchandej
  Petra Martić
  Wang Qiang

The following player received protected rankings into the singles main draw:
  Kateryna Bondarenko

The following players received entry from the qualifying draw:
  Ulrikke Eikeri
  Leonie Küng 
  Liang En-shuo
  Chihiro Muramatsu
  Ellen Perez
  Storm Sanders

The following player received entry as a lucky loser:
  Peangtarn Plipuech

Withdrawals
Before the tournament
  Paula Badosa → replaced by  Yuan Yue
  Eugenie Bouchard → replaced by  Peangtarn Plipuech
  Priscilla Hon → replaced by  Bibiane Schoofs
  Hsieh Su-wei → replaced by  Natalija Kostić
  Maddison Inglis → replaced by  Arina Rodionova
  Danka Kovinić → replaced by  Ankita Raina
  Barbora Krejčiková → replaced by  Chloé Paquet
  Tatjana Maria → replaced by  You Xiaodi
  Samantha Stosur → replaced by  Han Xinyun
  Dayana Yastremska → replaced by  Wang Xinyu

Doubles main draw entrants

Seeds

1 Rankings as of February 3, 2020

Other entrants 
The following pairs received wildcards into the doubles main draw:
  Kateryna Bondarenko /  Tamarine Tanasugarn
  Ng Kwan-yau /  Elina Svitolina

Champions

Singles

  Magda Linette def.  Leonie Küng 6–3, 6–2

Doubles

  Arina Rodionova /  Storm Sanders def.  Barbara Haas /  Ellen Perez 6–3, 6–3

References

External links
Official website
WTA profile

 
 WTA Tour
 in women's tennis
Tennis, WTA Tour, Thailand Open
Tennis, WTA Tour, Thailand Open

Tennis, WTA Tour, Thailand Open